Margaret Patricia Curran (born 24 November 1958) is a Scottish Labour Party politician. She served in the British House of Commons as the Member of Parliament (MP) for Glasgow East from 2010 to 2015 and was Shadow Secretary of State for Scotland from 2011 until 2015. She was previously the Member of the Scottish Parliament (MSP) for Glasgow Baillieston from 1999 to 2011, and held a number of posts within the Scottish Executive, including Minister for Parliamentary Business, Minister for Social Justice and Minister for Communities.

Early life and education
Curran was born in Glasgow, the daughter of Irish parents James Curran and Rose McConnellogue. She was educated at Our Lady and St Francis School in Glasgow.

Curran attended the University of Glasgow, where she graduated with an MA degree in History and Economic History in 1981. She first became politically active in the university's Labour Club in the late 1970s, where she was associated with future Scottish Labour leader Johann Lamont and future Labour MSP Sarah Boyack. She held several posts in Labour student politics, including secretary and vice-chair of Glasgow University Labour Club, and chair and secretary of the Scottish Organisation of Labour Students. In 1977, she was involved in the unsuccessful campaign to elect Hortensia Allende, the former First Lady of Chile, as Rector of the University of Glasgow.

She was a community worker, and then a lecturer in community education at the University of Strathclyde, a subject she holds a Certificate in. Curran was Mohammad Sarwar's election agent at Glasgow Govan for the 1997 general election. In 2021, Sarwar's son Anas became Leader of the Scottish Labour Party.

Member of the Scottish Parliament
In 1999 Curran was elected to the new Scottish Parliament, and was promoted to a junior minister when Henry McLeish became First Minister and later became a member of the Scottish Executive. She served as convenor of the Social Inclusion committee, then was promoted to Deputy Minister for Social Justice. She then rose to become minister in that portfolio, which later changed to Minister for Communities, introducing the Homelessness (Scotland) Bill in September 2002. She held the position of Minister for Parliamentary Business from 2004 until 2007.

She was re-elected comfortably in 2003 and again in 2007. Given Scottish Labour's losses in that later election, she was widely viewed as a popular potential successor to Jack McConnell as its leader, but decided not to stand against Wendy Alexander. Curran pledged her support to Iain Gray who was standing against Cathy Jamieson and Andy Kerr. Iain Gray was voted Scottish Labour Party Leader and appointed Curran to manage the party's 2011 election manifesto. She stood down as MSP for Glasgow Baillieston at the 2011 Scottish election.

2008 Glasgow East by-election

On 30 June 2008, David Marshall, MP for Glasgow East, resigned from the House of Commons on grounds of ill health, triggering a by-election. The Labour candidate for the by-election was to have been announced on 4 July, though the announcement was postponed when the likely choice, local councillor George Ryan, chose to withdraw from the nomination process. On 5 July, Curran placed herself forward for nomination on the Labour Party's shortlist and was confirmed as their candidate on 7 July. The by-election took place on 24 July 2008 and Curran was defeated by John Mason of the Scottish National Party by 365 votes. The swing from Labour was 22.54%.

Member of Parliament
At the 2010 general election, Curran regained Glasgow East for Labour from the Scottish National Party. After her electoral victory was announced, she walked out with the other candidates from the platform, refusing to make a speech whilst sharing the platform with the British National Party candidate. From 2010 to 2011, she was Shadow Minister for Disabled People.

On 7 October 2011, in a Shadow Cabinet reshuffle, Labour Party leader Ed Miliband sacked Ann McKechin and appointed Curran as her replacement for Shadow Secretary of State for Scotland. Willie Bain, then-MP for Glasgow North East, also became Curran's new deputy as Shadow Scotland Office Minister, replacing Tom Greatrex.

At the 2015 general election, she lost her seat to Natalie McGarry of the Scottish National Party. This was a  landslide defeat for Scottish Labour; who lost forty of the forty-one seats they were defending, and were reduced to a single MP at Westminster, with the SNP elected in 56 of Scotland's 59 seats. With many veteran Labour politicians losing their seats, including: then-Shadow Foreign Secretary Douglas Alexander and then-Scottish Labour Party Leader, Jim Murphy. Presenting speeches following their constituency's declaration, Curran declined to speak following the announcement of her own defeat.

Views on Alex Salmond
Curran was known to have a particularly difficult relationship with SNP leader Alex Salmond. In 2012, Curran accused Salmond and his government of having a "culture of casual dishonesty", and suggested his "blokeish attitude" made him a liability among women in Scotland during the Scottish independence referendum campaign. In November 2011, she told Holyrood magazine that were Salmond to be killed by being run over by a bus, she would have no interest in finding out who the driver was. In April 2014, she dismissed Salmond's appeal to female voters, saying "Women will see through his cynical attempts to win them over" and described a speech he made as "drivel". Speaking about a work programme whilst in Dundee, Curran stated "Every time I'm in Dundee people have raised their disappointment with the former First Minister over his promise. Renewable energy is a sector Dundee badly needs and the city has been let down badly by his retreat from promise. I think Alex Salmond should apologise to the people of Dundee". These comments related to the fact that only 15% of Work Programme participants had proceeded to find a job.

Personal life
She and her husband Robert "Rab" Murray live in Glasgow with their two sons. Curran listed her recreations in Who's Who as "reading, theatre, American politics" and "spending time with my sons".

References

External links
 
Margaret Curran MSP Scottish Labour website

|-

|-

|-

|-

|-

1958 births
Living people
Alumni of the University of Glasgow
Baillieston
Academics of the University of Strathclyde
Female members of the Parliament of the United Kingdom for Scottish constituencies
Labour MSPs
Members of the Parliament of the United Kingdom for Glasgow constituencies
Members of the Scottish Parliament 1999–2003
Members of the Scottish Parliament 2003–2007
Members of the Scottish Parliament 2007–2011
Members of the Scottish Parliament for Glasgow constituencies
Scottish Labour MPs
Scottish people of Irish descent
UK MPs 2010–2015
Ministers of the Scottish Government
Women members of the Scottish Government
20th-century Scottish women politicians